Screen Time is a 30 minute Australian television program which commenced screening on the ABC on 17 October 2017 at 8:00pm. It is hosted by Chris Taylor and features a panel of rotating guests who discuss film, television and online content.

Panelists include: Sophie Black (journalist), Marc Fennell, Benjamin Law, Judith Lucy, Nakkiah Lui, Zan Rowe, Sami Shah, Michael Williams (broadcaster), Susie Youssef.

Season 1

Episode 1: Tuesday 17 Oct 2017
Panelists (r to l): Sami Shah, Sophie Black, Chris Taylor (host), Zan Rowe, Benjamin Law

Topics
Content is King: Cinema movies, Netflix, Stan, Amazon, ABC iView, SBS on Demand, Foxtel, Tenplay, Freeview, YouTube, Vimeo, Facebook, Snapchat
Denis Villeneuve's (Dennis Newtown's) Bladerunner 2049, Bechdel test
Addiction to making Sequels
Sophie Monk 'Jane Austen' parody
Females in Broad City / Girls / Sex and the City / Golden Girls / Seinfeld
Take 5 Countdown segment: Weirdest Sex scenes

Recommendations
Sami Shah: The Expanse on Netflix
Benjamin Law: Ali's Wedding in the cinemas
Zan Rowe: Japanese reality show Terrace House on Netflix
Sophie Black: 'Tiny Kitchen' on YouTube

Episode 2: Tuesday 24 Oct 2017
Panelists (r to l): Sami Shah, Sophie Black, Chris Taylor (host), Judith Lucy, Michael Williams

Topics
Harvey Weinstein sexual abuse allegations
Good Time (film) starring Robert Pattinson
Prolonging a teen idol's career - Viggo Mortensen, Orlando Bloom
Not On My Watch segment: Channel Seven's Cosmetic Coffee
David Simon's The Deuce starring James Franco and Maggie Gyllenhaal on Foxtel
The Wire, Treme, Homicide: Life on the Street
Take 5 Countdown segment: Double Trouble, actors who shouldn't take on more than one role in a scene

Recommendations
Michael Williams: SBS's drama Sunshine
Sami Shah: Patton Oswalt's comedy special 'Annihilation'
Sophie Black: ABC's Get Krack!n with Kate McLennan and Kate McCartney
Judith Lucy: I Love Dick series created by Jill Soloway and Sarah Gubbins

Episode 3: Tuesday 31 Oct 2017
Panelists (r to l): Sami Shah, Sophie Black, Chris Taylor (host), Judith Lucy, Marc Fennell

Topics
The Bachelorette with Sophie Monk
Thor: Ragnarok directed by Taika Waititi and starring Chris Hemsworth
Growth of Marvel Universe franchise
Take 5 Countdown segment: Marvel's least convincing superheroes
Larry David's Curb Your Enthusiasm and its music theme

Recommendations
Marc Fennell: The Good Place on Netflix
Sami Shah: 'Active Shooter' on Stan
Judith Lucy: Anne Edmond's 'Edge of the Bush' on ABC iView
Sophie Black: British comedy Chewing Gum on Netflix
Chris Taylor: classic Spartacus (film)

Episode 4: Tuesday 07 Nov 2017
Panelists (r to l): Michael Williams, Susie Youssef, Chris Taylor (host), Nakkiah Lui, Marc Fennell

Topics
Sci-Fi horror series Stranger Things 2 on Netflix
Not On My Watch segment:  Channel Seven's The Wall
Australian romcom movie Three Summers directed by Ben Elton
Australian ockers in film since 1970s
Take 5 Countdown segment: Worst musical moments in movies

Recommendations
Susie Youssef: Master of None (season 2) on Netflix
Michael Williams: British series Back on ABC iView
Nakkiah Liu: Mindhunter (season 1) on Netflix 
Marc Fennell: 'Borders' on vox.com

Episode 5: Tuesday 14 Nov 2017
Panelists (r to l): Sami Shah, Zan Rowe, Chris Taylor (host), Judith Lucy, Benjamin Law

Topics
Kathryn Bigelow's new civil rights drama Detroit, police brutality & racism in the USA
Katryn Bigelow's career: The Hurt Locker
Not on My Watch: Instant Hotel reality show on Seven
Norwegian phenomenon 'Slow TV'

Recommendations
Judith Lucy: Quarry (TV series) on iTunes
Sami Shah: Binging with Babish (making movie recipes) on YouTube
Zan Rowe: Documentary 'Joan Didion: The Center Will Not Hold' on Netflix
Benjamin Law: 2017 Thai film Bad Genius in selected cinema
Chris Taylor: Slow TV suggestions

Episode 6: Tuesday 21 Nov 2017
Panelists: Chris Taylor (host), Judith Lucy, Sami Shah, Sophie Black, Benjamin Law

Topics
Nicole Kidman's career, The Killing of a Sacred Deer
Transparent

Recommendations

Episode 7: Tuesday 28 Nov 2017
Panelists (r to l): Benjamin Law, Zan Rowe, Chris Taylor (host), Nakkiah Lui, Marc Fennell

Topics
Buses blocking Demolition videos
Murder on the Orient Express (2017 film) directed by Kenneth Branagh
Gogglebox (season 6), raising social issues & diversity
Imaginary 'Googlebox' review of 'Screen Time'

Recommendations
Marc Fennell: Star Trek: Discovery on Netflix 
Zan Rowe: Brisbane Band 'The Go-Betweens: Right Here' documentary on ABC iView
Benjamin Law: Will & Grace relaunched on Stan
2017 She's Gotta Have It (TV series) directed by Spike Lee on Netflix

Episode 8: Tuesday 05 Dec 2017
Panelists (r to l): Susie Youssef, Sophie Black, Chris Taylor (host), Zan Rowe, Marc Fennell

Topics
Replacing Kevin Spacey with Christopher Plummer in All the Money in the World directed by Ridley Scott
Friday on my Mind about The Easybeats on ABC iView, importance of good casting
Popularity of Australian biopics: The Dismissal (miniseries), Bodyline (miniseries), Paper Giants, Howzat! Kerry Packer's War, Peter Allen: Not the Boy Next Door, INXS: Never Tear Us Apart, Schapelle (TV film), House of Hancock, Molly (miniseries), Hoges: The Paul Hogan Story, The Queen
The Meyerowitz Stories directed by Noah Baubach, starring Dustin Hoffman on Netflix
Adam Sandler's career, Ben Stiller

Recommendations
Susie Youssef: The Crown (TV series) (season 1) on Netflix
Sophie Black: You Can't Ask That on ABC iView
Zan Rowe: Veep (season 6) on Foxtel Now
Marc Fennell: Crazy Ex-Girlfriend (TV series) on Netflix

References

Australian non-fiction television series
Australian Broadcasting Corporation original programming
2017 Australian television series debuts
2017 Australian television series endings
English-language television shows